The men's competition in the middle-heavyweight (– 94 kg) division was staged on November 26 and 27, 2009.

Schedule

Medalists

Records

Results

References
Results 

- Mens 94 kg, 2009 World Weightlifting Championships